Godda Lok Sabha constituency is one of the 14 Lok Sabha (parliamentary) constituencies in Jharkhand state in eastern India. This constituency covers the entire Godda district and parts of Deoghar and Dumka districts.

Assembly segments
Presently, Godda Lok Sabha constituency comprises the following six Vidhan Sabha (legislative assembly) segments:

Members of Parliament

Election results

See also
 Deoghar district
 Godda district
 List of Constituencies of the Lok Sabha

Notes

External links
Godda lok sabha  constituency election 2019 result details

Lok Sabha constituencies in Jharkhand
Godda district
Deoghar district